The Stemmons Corridor or Lower Stemmons is a stretch of industrial and commercial property in northwest Dallas, Texas (USA). From downtown north, Interstate 35E (I-35E) is known as the Stemmons Freeway, named so for Leslie Stemmons by his son, John M. Stemmons. It lies north of downtown, west of Oak Lawn, east of the Trinity River and Irving, and south of the Elm Fork of the Trinity River. The area has a considerable amount of hotels and office towers. Property in the district accounts for 20% of Dallas' tax base. I-35E in Dallas Texas is currently the widest freeway in the DFW area with 16 total lanes, 10 lanes of high speed freeway with 6 lanes of access roads, stretching from the Woodall Rodgers Expressway in Downtown Dallas to the State Highway 183 split. I-35E is one of the most congested freeways in the country.

Neighborhoods 
 Dallas Market Center
 Victory Park (also considered part of downtown or Oak Lawn).
 Arlington Park (also considered a part of West Dallas).

Infrastructure

Health systems 

Southwestern Medical Center, Parkland Memorial Hospital (County Hospital), Dallas county Children's Medical center, and St. Paul Hospital is located in the Stemmons Corridor.

Transportation

Commuter rail 
 Medical/Market Center (TRE station)

Light rail 
DART:  and

Highways 
Interstate 35E

See also

References